Pangani Falls Dam is a dam in Tanzania, which is part of the Pangani Hydro Systems. The dam is located at Koani in the Muheza District of the Tanga Region, about 8 km south of another power station at Hale.

Overview
Construction of the dam began in December 1991 and was commissioned quickly just 3 years later to aid the ailing power shortages in the country. The entire project was funded by European Scandinavian nations (Norway, Finland and Sweden), which  jointly decided to finance the Pangani Falls Redevelopment Project in 1989.

The project cost a total of US$126 Million and was funded by three financiers: NORAD of Norway (42%); FINNIDA of Finland (33%) and SIDA of Sweden (25%).

See also

Tanesco 
List of power stations in Tanzania

References

External links
Tanesco Website

Buildings and structures in the Tanga Region
Dams in Tanzania
Pangani basin